Events in the year 1912 in Portugal.

Incumbents
President:  Manuel de Arriaga 
Prime Minister: Augusto de Vasconcelos (until 16 June), Duarte Leite (from 16 June)
President of Chamber of Deputies: António Aresta Branco until 29 November; Vítor Macedo Pinto from 2 December
President of Senate of the Republic: Anselmo Braamcamp Freire

Events
6 January - Due to a violation of article 379 of the Penal Code, Bishop of the Algarve was prohibited from residing in his diocese for two years by Ministry of Justice António Macieira.
28 January - Inauguration of the Free University of Lisbon in a formal session at the Coliseu dos Recreios, in the presence of the President of the Republic, Manuel de Arriaga.
24 February - Establishment of the Republican Union and Evolutionist Party political parties.
8 July - Royalist attack on Chaves

Sport
Establishment of Clube de Futebol Esperança de Lagos
Establishment of Leça F.C.
Establishment of S.C. Olhanense
Establishment of C.D. Olivais e Moscavide
5 May to 27 July - Portugal at the 1912 Summer Olympics

References

 
Portugal
Years of the 20th century in Portugal
Portugal